Jean-Baptiste Martzluff (born 26 October 1958) is a French volleyball player. He competed in the men's tournament at the 1988 Summer Olympics.

References

1958 births
Living people
French men's volleyball players
Olympic volleyball players of France
Volleyball players at the 1988 Summer Olympics
Place of birth missing (living people)